Warragul railway station is located on the Gippsland line in Victoria, Australia. It serves the town of Warragul, and it opened on 1 March 1878 as Warrigal. It was renamed Warragul on 1 May 1879.

It was the junction station for the branch line to Neerim South and Noojee, which closed in 1958.

The line between Pakenham and Warragul was duplicated in various stages between 1952 and 1956, and was electrified in 1954. Two years earlier, in 1952, the line to Yarragon was duplicated, and in 1955, electrification was extended to Moe.

Starting from 15 February 1987, and lasting until December 1998, the station was the terminus of a number of The Met/PTC electric passenger services from Flinders Street. The line was de-electrified beyond Warragul on 28 June 1987, and the overhead support structures were removed in 2005/2006, as part of the Regional Fast Rail project.

The former "A" siding was abolished in 1988, along with alterations to the points, signals and levers. Also during 1988, the double line block system between Warragul and Yarragon was abolished, with automatic three position signalling introduced. This introduction also resulted in the abolition of signal boxes "A" and "B", both replaced by a signal panel in the station building.

The tracks in the former yard are now used as storage for concrete sleepers, old and new signals, and rail machines. Tracks on the northern side of the station were moved slightly, to reduce the radius of curves, and allow trains to travel at higher speed.

On 28 April 2006, the signal panel within the station building was abolished.

The station itself was upgraded in 2015. It included a new car park and a bus interchange, a new footbridge next to the Alfred Street overpass and a new road underpass at Normanby Place, located at the eastern end of the station.

Platforms and services

Warragul has one island platform with two faces. It is serviced by V/Line Traralgon and Bairnsdale line services.

Platform 1:
  services to Southern Cross in the morning and early afternoon
  services to Traralgon and Bairnsdale in the late afternoon and evening

Platform 2:
  services to Traralgon and Bairnsdale in the morning and early afternoon
  services to Southern Cross in the late afternoon and evening

Transport links

Warragul Bus Lines operates eight routes via Warragul station, under contract to Public Transport Victoria:
: to Warragul South
: to Warragul North
: to Warragul North
: to Warragul East
: to Drouin station
: to Noojee
Garfield station – Traralgon Plaza
Traralgon station – Drouin North

Gallery

References

External links

Victorian Railway Stations Gallery
Melway map

Railway stations in Australia opened in 1878
Regional railway stations in Victoria (Australia)
Victorian Heritage Register
Transport in Gippsland (region)
Shire of Baw Baw
Listed railway stations in Australia